The Yakovlev Yak-10 was a Soviet light liaison aircraft designed and built by the Yakovlev design bureau in the 1940s.

Design and development
In the late 1940s the Soviet forces had a need for a light liaison aircraft that was smaller than the Antonov An-2. The company derived two four-seat aircraft with wooden wings and metal fuselages, from the earlier AIR-6. The Yak-10, a high-wing strut-braced monoplane with fixed landing gear and the Yak-13 a low-wing cantilever monoplane with a manually retractable landing gear. Both aircraft were powered by a 145 hp M-11MF radial engine. After tests in 1945, the Yak-10 was awarded a production contract for 40 aircraft, despite unimpressive performance. The company built a number of different variants but soon produced an improved design, the Yak-12, which, although of similar layout, was not a derivative of the Yak-10.

The Yak-10 only entered limited production before it was replaced by the superior Yakovlev Yak-12, and although the Yak-13 proved to be superior to the original Yak-10, production was not carried out.

Variants
Yak-10
Strut-braced high-wing monoplane powered by a Shvetsov M-11MF radial engine.
Yak-10G
Floatplane variant with twin floats.
Yak-10S
Ambulance variant with room for one stretcher.
Yak-10V
Dual control.
Yak-13
Low-wing monoplane derivative, using an almost identical fuselage and Shvetsov M-11MF engine installation, with a cantilevered wooden low wing for direct comparison with the Yak-10. One built.

Specifications (Yak-10)

See also

References

Notes

Bibliography

1940s Soviet military utility aircraft
Yak-010
Single-engined tractor aircraft
High-wing aircraft
Aircraft first flown in 1944